Artem Borysovych Rubanko (born 21 August 1974 in Kyiv, in the Ukrainian SSR of the Soviet Union) is a Ukrainian hammer thrower. His personal best throw is 80.44 metres, achieved in May 2004 in Kyiv. He competed at the 2004, 2008 Olympic Games and 2012 Olympic Games without reaching the final.

Achievements

References

1974 births
Living people
Sportspeople from Kyiv
Ukrainian male hammer throwers
Athletes (track and field) at the 2004 Summer Olympics
Athletes (track and field) at the 2008 Summer Olympics
Athletes (track and field) at the 2012 Summer Olympics
Olympic athletes of Ukraine